Ahmetbeyler is a village in the Göynük District, Bolu Province, Turkey. Its population is 218 (2021).

References

Villages in Göynük District